Soyuqbulaqlar (also, Soyuq Bulaqlar) is a village in the municipality of Köçvəlili in the Agstafa Rayon of Azerbaijan.

References

Populated places in Aghstafa District